The Stadler Euro (known as the Vossloh Euro until 2015) is a class of diesel-electric locomotives built by Stadler Rail for the European market. It is available in two basic variants, the four-axle Euro 3000, and the six-axle Euro 4000. These locomotives are powered by EMD 710 prime movers. A six-axle electric-only variant is marketed as Euro 6000; it is also built for the Iberian gauge.

History and background
At the beginning of the 2000s, numerous private train operators emerged in mainland Europe, as open-access freight operation was already granted in some European countries before complete liberalization in 2012. These mainly used second-hand diesel locomotives formerly in use with the state railways of the respective country, or new medium-powered diesel locomotives like the EMD Class 66 or Vossloh G2000. With the success of these operators rising and trains getting heavier, the need of a complete new high-powered diesel locomotive series was becoming high, especially for cross-border freight traffic where absence of, or changes in electrification voltage made electric traction impossible or problematic.

Primarily due to environmental issues and high costs, developments for such a new locomotive series were pushed back whenever possible. In the mid-2000s development of a new series finally seemed economically viable; becoming part of Alstom's Prima locomotive programme. Development of the programme was started under Alstom supervision, but as the Alstom Valencia plant was bought by Vossloh this series got the Vossloh name: Vossloh Euro.

The family can be traced back to the Electro-Motive Diesel engined, Valencia built JT 42BW, JT 42CW and JT 42HW-HS family which were built in various configurations (including 4 and 6 axle variants) for both Israel Railways and English, Welsh and Scottish Railway (as the Class 67); these locomotives used the same GM-EMD engines and traction motors and had similar body shells to the products later built at the Valencia plant under Vossloh's ownership.

In 2004, the Valencia plant left Alstom ownership and was bought by Vossloh; because of this change of ownership, there are many similarities between the Vossloh Euro locomotives, the Alsthom/GM-EMD JT42 locomotives.

After the change of ownership, the next product to roll off the lines at Valencia was the RENFE Class 334 locomotives which are (excluding minor differences) Iberian gauge versions of the later Vossloh Euro locomotives.

Technology

The common factor between this class of locomotives and its predecessors is the General Motors Electro-motive (now Electro-Motive Diesel, since 2010 a subsidiary of Caterpillar) EMD 710 engine and EMD D43 electric motors with associated electronic controls (except for the Euro 3000 AC introduced in 2011, which uses EMD AC electric motors). Thus EMD supplies the entire engine (see also prime mover) and power transmission system for these locomotives including the generator.

The rigid bodyshell show technical similarities with the predecessors (RENFE Class 334 and EWS class 67). The design is modular allowing easy access and change of internal components.

Vossloh suggests that the locomotives could be supplied with alternative engines subject to the customers demands.

The twin cabs have a central driving position with the controls arranged around the drivers seat, the cab is air-conditioned and temperature controlled and designed to minimise noise.

Cold weather variants are available - with additional devices to prevent snow causing problems.

As the locomotives are designed specifically with the European rail network in mind, they can be fitted a variety of different safety systems and are prepared for the ETCS (European Train Control System).

While there have been several orders for the Euro 4000 model, there have only been two orders for the Euro 3000 model, in 2004 and 2011. The Euro 3000 AC units ordered by Israel Railways in 2011 differ considerably from the earlier Euro 3000 model. Their chassis will resemble that of Vossloh's new Eurolight locomotive, they will utilize a newer and more advanced variant of the EMD710 12-cylinder 3,300 hp engine, will use newer computerized control systems and employ EMD/Siemens AC traction motors (rather than DC engines on the original Euro 3000 model) which will be mounted in a Bo'Bo' bogie of a different design than the earlier Euro 3000 model.

Career and orders
The passenger version Euro 3000 locomotives are essentially the same as RENFE Class 334 ordered prior to the change of ownership of the Valencia plant; they continued production under Vossloh ownership. (The RENFE 334's can be considered members of both the Alstom Prima and Vossloh Euro locomotive families). There have only been two orders for the Euro 3000 model, in 2004 and 2011, with these two Euro 3000 variants differing significantly technically (see 'Technology' section above).

The Euro 4000 demonstrator locomotive was built in 2006 and was exhibited at the InnoTrans 2006 fair. It was then tested on different German main lines before being sold to Angel Trains Cargo.

Afro 4000

The South African Class Afro 4000 is a  version of the Euro 4000. In late November 2014 the first of twenty new Afro 4000 diesel-electric locomotives for the Passenger Rail Agency of South Africa (PRASA) came ashore in Table Bay Harbour. The locomotive, the first new engine to be acquired by PRASA since its establishment, was officially unveiled at Cape Town Station on 1 December 2014.

The twenty Afro 4000 diesel-electric locomotives, to be followed by fifty Vossloh-built AfroDual electro-diesel locomotives, were acquired by Swifambo Rail Leasing, a rolling stock company, and will be operated by PRASA on lease.

In late 2015 Prasa began proceedings at the South African high court to terminate the contract for both the Afro4000 and other dual mode locomotives ordered from Vossloh - specific issues included the supplied diesel locomotives being substantially out of gauge for parts of the network ( high versus a  limit specified by Transnet).

Orders

See also
South African Class Afro 4000
Voith Maxima, GE PowerHaul and EMD Series 66, competitors to the Euro 4000 in 1435mm gauge.

Notes

References 

Macosa/Meinfesa/Vossloh Espana locomotives
CargoNet locomotives
Railway locomotives introduced in 2006
Bo′Bo′ locomotives
Co′Co′ locomotives
Standard gauge railway locomotives
5 ft 6 in gauge locomotives